The 21st Golden Globe Awards, honoring the best in film and television for 1963, were held on March 11, 1964.

Winners and nominees

Film

Best Film - Drama
 The Cardinal
America America
Captain Newman, M.D.
The Caretakers
Cleopatra
The Great Escape
Hud
Lilies of the Field

Best Film - Comedy or Musical
 Tom Jones
Irma la Douce
Under the Yum Yum Tree
Bye Bye Birdie
It's a Mad, Mad, Mad, Mad World
A Ticklish Affair

Best Actor - Drama
 Sidney Poitier - Lilies of the Field
Marlon Brando - The Ugly American
Stathis Giallelis - America America
Rex Harrison - Cleopatra
Steve McQueen - Love with the Proper Stranger
Paul Newman - Hud
Gregory Peck - Captain Newman, M.D.
Tom Tryon - The Cardinal

Best Actress - Drama
 Leslie Caron - The L-Shaped Room
Polly Bergen - The Caretakers
Geraldine Page - Toys in the Attic
Rachel Roberts - This Sporting Life
Romy Schneider - The Cardinal
Alida Valli - The Paper Man
Marina Vlady - The Conjugal Bed
Natalie Wood - Love with the Proper Stranger

Best Actor - Comedy or Musical
 Alberto Sordi - To Bed or Not to Bed
Albert Finney - Tom Jones
James Garner - The Wheeler Dealers
Cary Grant - Charade
Jack Lemmon - Irma la Douce
Jack Lemmon - Under the Yum Yum Tree
Frank Sinatra - Come Blow Your Horn
Terry-Thomas - The Mouse on the Moon
Jonathan Winters - It's a Mad, Mad, Mad, Mad World

Best Actress - Comedy or Musical
 Shirley MacLaine - Irma la Douce
Ann-Margret - Bye Bye Birdie
Doris Day - Move Over, Darling
Audrey Hepburn - Charade
Hayley Mills - Summer Magic
Molly Picon - Come Blow Your Horn
Jill St. John - Come Blow Your Horn
Joanne Woodward - A New Kind of Love

Best Supporting Actor
 John Huston - The Cardinal
Lee J. Cobb - Come Blow Your Horn
Bobby Darin - Captain Newman, M.D.
Melvyn Douglas - Hud
Hugh Griffith - Tom Jones
Paul Mann - America America
Roddy McDowall - Cleopatra
Gregory Rozakis - America America

Best Supporting Actress
 Margaret Rutherford - The V.I.P.s
Diane Baker - The Prize
Joan Greenwood - Tom Jones
Wendy Hiller - Toys in the Attic
Linda Marsh - America America
Patricia Neal - Hud
Liselotte Pulver - A Global Affair
Lilia Skala - Lilies of the Field

Best Director
 Elia Kazan - America America
Hall Bartlett - The Caretakers
George Englund - The Ugly American
Joseph L. Mankiewicz - Cleopatra
Otto Preminger - The Cardinal
Tony Richardson - Tom Jones
Martin Ritt - Hud
Robert Wise - The Haunting

Television

Best Series - Drama
 The Richard Boone Show
Bonanza
The Defenders
The Eleventh Hour
Rawhide

Best Series - Comedy
 The Dick Van Dyke Show
The Beverly Hillbillies
The Bob Hope Show
The Jack Benny Show
The Red Skelton Show

Best Series - Variety
 The Danny Kaye Show
The Andy Williams Show
The Garry Moore Show
The Judy Garland Show
The Tonight Show

Best TV Star - Male
 Mickey Rooney - Mickey
Richard Boone - The Richard Boone Show
Jackie Gleason - Jackie Gleason: American Scene Magazine
Lorne Greene - Bonanza
E.G. Marshall - The Defenders

Best TV Star - Female
 Inger Stevens - The Farmer's Daughter
Shirley Booth - Hazel
Carolyn Jones - Burke's Law
Dorothy Loudon - The Garry Moore Show
Gloria Swanson - Burke's Law

References
IMdb 1964 Golden Globe Awards

021
1963 film awards
1963 television awards
1963 awards in the United States
March 1964 events in the United States